Plasma Wave Subsystem (sometimes called Plasma Wave System), abbreviated PWS,  is an instrument that is on board the Voyager 1 and Voyager 2 unmanned probes of the Voyager program. The device is 16 channel step frequency receiver and a low-frequency waveform receiver that can measure electron density. The PWS uses the two long antenna in a V-shape on the spacecraft, which are also used by another instrument on the spacecraft. The instrument recorded data about the Solar System's gas giants, and about the outer reaches of the Heliosphere, and beyond. In the 2010s the PWS was used to play the "sounds of interstellar space" as the spacecraft can sample the local interstellar medium after they departed the Sun's heliosphere. The heliosphere is a region essentially under the influence of the Sun's solar wind, rather than the local interstellar environment, and is another way of understanding the Solar System in comparison to the objects gravitationally bound (e.g in orbit) around Earth's Sun.

The PWS instrument plan was introduced in 1974 during the development of the Voyager program. It was hoped it would help increase understanding of wave particle interactions and record data on the magnetospheres of planets like Jupiter and Saturn. The instruments went on to record radio waves at Jupiter, Saturn, Uranus, and Neptune.

The PWS instrument is one of the instruments that is a part of the Voyager interstellar mission, and they have operated for several decades after their 1977 launch into the 2010s.

Specifications
List:
Mass: 1.4 kg (3.08 pounds)
Average electrical power consumption: 1.3 watts
Average data rate: 0.032 kbit/s
Frequency range 10 Hz to 56 kHz 
PWS/PRA Antenna:
Length of antenna: 10 meters (10.936 yards)
Number of antenna: 2
Angle between antenna: 90 degrees

PWS and PRS

See also
New Horizons (see plasma and high-energy particle spectrometer suite)
Waves in plasmas
Waves (Juno) (Spacecraft instrument aboard the Juno Jupiter orbiter of the 2010s)

References

External links
PWS

Voyager program
Spacecraft instruments